The Shops at Wisconsin Place is an open-air shopping center that is part of the mixed-use Wisconsin Place complex, located in Chevy Chase, Maryland, located on the site of a former Woodward & Lothrop department store, which was converted to Hecht's in 1995 and closed in 2005. The Shops are anchored by Maryland's second Bloomingdale's, which opened on September 27, 2007, and Whole Foods Market, which opened on May 18, 2010. P.F. Chang's, Talbots, Cole Haan, Anthropologie, Eileen Fisher, BCBG, MAC, The Capital Grille, Sephora, J. Jill, Ilori, Adolfo Dominguez, Le Pain Quotidien, and Giggle are now open. There is a three-story underground parking garage located beneath the shopping center. A  county-run recreation and community center opened in Wisconsin Place in late September 2009. In addition to the Shops, parking, and the recreation center, Wisconsin Place includes a high-rise luxury apartment building and office space partially occupied by Microsoft.

References

External links
The Shops at Wisconsin Place
Archstone Wisconsin Place

Shopping malls in Maryland
Buildings and structures in Montgomery County, Maryland
Tourist attractions in Montgomery County, Maryland
Shopping malls established in 2007
2007 establishments in Maryland
Shopping malls in the Washington metropolitan area
Chevy Chase, Maryland